Tracey Ullman: A Class Act is an ITV sketch comedy television special starring Tracey Ullman, along with Michael Palin, playing a variety of original characters.

The show introduced viewers to characters that would go on to be featured in Ullman's American comedy special and HBO television series: gay flight attendant Trevor Ayliss, wife to a conservative MP, Virginia Bugge, and future magazine editor, Janie Pillsworth, and her mother, Jacqueline.

A Class Act aired on HBO in the United States on 23 November 1993. It acted as a follow-up to Ullman's American HBO comedy special, Tracey Ullman Takes on New York. The HBO cut of the special opens with Ullman ("Filling in for Alistair Cooke") explaining the British class system to the American audience.

Premise
The show opens aboard "Class Air", a British airline that seats passengers according to social class: lower, middle, upper.

37 up
In a parody of the British documentary Seven Up!, three children are followed from childhood to adulthood.

Powder Room
Various characters visit the powder room.

Hethers
A young girl, Janine Pillsworth is placed in a posh boarding school by her working class parents. She subsequently reinvents herself as "Janie" and disowns them.

Back on Class Air
Airline steward Trevor visits the working class section of the plane and closes the show singing "I Am What I Am".

Cast
 Tracey Ullman as Various
 Michael Palin as Various
 Timothy Spall
 Susan Wooldridge as Virginia Birdsall

Production
After the conclusion of The Tracey Ullman Show in 1990, Ullman decided to take a break from television. She had no desire to return to the format as the demands of doing a weekly show in front of a live studio audience left her exhausted. She also felt artistically satiated with what she achieved. She was also pregnant with her second child and decided to turn her attention to motherhood. In 1992, her husband, independent British television producer, Allan McKeown placed a bid a television franchise in the South of England. Included with his bid was a potential television programming lineup which included a Tracey Ullman special. Thinking nothing of it, Ullman continued enjoying her less hectic schedule. To her horror, McKeown's bid was successful, forcing her to return television. She decided on a new format and to shoot the entire show on location. This would allow her ample time to apply makeup, wigs, and other accoutrements for the characters at a reasonable pace. When it came to a premise, Ullman decided to focus the show on British class system, a subject that interested her for years. Tracey Ullman: A Class Act premiered on 9 January 1993 on ITV.

Format
The show features four sketches, with the first acting as bookends. Ullman plays a total of eleven characters; she's accompanied in the sketches by Monty Python alum Michael Palin who also plays multiple parts.

Reception

Awards and nominations

Home media
A Class Act was released on home video in the UK in 1993. In 2009, the special (HBO version) became available in the United States via iTunes and Amazon Video-On-Demand albeit edited. The character Trevor Ayliss is omitted entirely, as is the concluding song "I Am What I Am". The unedited British cut of the special was made available through Hulu in the United States in 2012.

References

Sources

External links
 
 Entertainment Weekly: "Brit Wit Tracey Ullman Gives the English a Funny Pounding"
 Variety: "Tracey Ullman: A Class Act"
 

Tracey Ullman
ITV comedy
HBO network specials
Television series by ITV Studios
1993 television specials
1990s American television specials
Television series by Fremantle (company)